Incels (a portmanteau for involuntary celibates) is an online community whose members define themselves as being unable to find a romantic or sexual partner despite desiring one. 

Incel may also refer to:
 Incel (company), defunct paper and pulp industry firm in Banja Luka, Bosnia and Herzegovina (1954-1990s)
 Incel, a trade name for Biricodar,  an unreleased pharmaceutical drug
 /r/incels, a banned Reddit community for incels

See also
 Insel (disambiguation)